Nikolay Nikolaev (born 2 April 1970, Moscow) is a Russian political figure and a deputy of the 7th and 8th State Dumas. 

From 1994 to 1998, Nikolaev worked in Tashkent and Moscow as a correspondent at the East European Insurance Report (Financial Times). In 1991-2001, he was the head of the department of the insurance company "Progress-Garant". In 2003, he founded and headed the communication group "AMSCOM", which until 2009 provided services in public relations and authorities to companies in the financial sector. From 2010 to 2014, Nikolaev served as CEO of the National Association of Insurance Representatives. In 2013-2014, he was the vice president of the All-Russian public organization of small and medium business "Support of Russia". In 2016, he was elected deputy of the 7th State Duma. In 2021, he was re-elected for the 8th State Duma.

On 24 March 2022, the United States Treasury sanctioned him in response to the 2022 Russian invasion of Ukraine.

Awards  
 Order "For Merit to the Fatherland"

References

1970 births
Living people
United Russia politicians
21st-century Russian politicians
Eighth convocation members of the State Duma (Russian Federation)
Seventh convocation members of the State Duma (Russian Federation)
Russian individuals subject to the U.S. Department of the Treasury sanctions